Chuskuqucha (local Quechua chusku four, Quechua qucha lake, "four lakes", also spelled Chuscococha) is a  mountain in the Andes of Peru. It is located in the Huánuco Region, Dos de Mayo Province, Marías District.

References

Mountains of Peru
Mountains of Huánuco Region